Chamundeshwari Assembly Constituency is one of the 224 assembly-constituencies of Karnataka. It is part of Mysore (Lok Sabha constituency).

Members of Legislative Assembly

Election results

2018 Assembly Election

2006 Assembly Bypoll

2004 Assembly Election

See also
List of constituencies of the Karnataka Legislative Assembly

References

https://www.firstpost.com/politics/karnataka-election-results-siddaramaiahs-arrogance-lost-the-plot-former-cm-scraped-one-narrow-win-one-loss-4471821.html

Assembly constituencies of Karnataka
Mysore district